Johan Passave-Ducteil (born July 13, 1985) is a French basketball player for Fos Provence Basket of the LNB Pro A.

3x3 career
As part of Team Paris, Passave-Ducteil won the 2020 French Championship alongside teammates Angelo Tsagarakis, Léopold Cavalière and Antoine Eito.

Honours
Pro A (1): 2013
Pro B (1): 2011
Pro A All-Star (2): 2013, 2014

References

1985 births
Living people
Centers (basketball)
Champagne Châlons-Reims Basket players
ESSM Le Portel players
Fos Provence Basket players
French men's basketball players
JDA Dijon Basket players
JL Bourg-en-Bresse players
Limoges CSP players
Nanterre 92 players
People from Noisy-le-Grand
Sportspeople from Seine-Saint-Denis